Yeovil Town may refer to:
 Yeovil Town F.C., an English football team based in Yeovil, Somerset
 Yeovil Town L.F.C., an English women's football team affiliated with Yeovil Town F.C.
 Yeovil Town railway station, a defunct railway station that served the town of Yeovil